Carpenters Island is an island in the Rogue River in the U.S. state of Oregon about one mile upstream from Galice. It is named for Francis A. "Frank" Carpenter, a native of Illinois who settled there in the early 1900s.  The Bureau of Land Management maintains a small boat landing nearby called Carpenters Island Park.  Some maps identify the island as Carpenter Island, but the U.S. Board on Geographic Names has officially approved "Carpenters Island."

References

Landforms of Josephine County, Oregon
River islands of Oregon
Uninhabited islands of Oregon